Whirlwind is a pinball machine produced by Williams in 1990 and was one of the last Williams System 11b games. It was designed by Pat Lawlor, who created a previous natural disaster-themed pinball for Williams, Earthshaker!.

Gameplay
Whirlwind is distinguished by three playfield rotating discs, and a fan topper that blows wind on the player at certain times in the game. The objective in Whirlwind is to move the storm using the compass targets to light ball locks for multiball. In multiball, a progressive jackpot can be scored by making left ramp shots from the upper right flipper. Alternatively, one can work towards the "Wizard Mode" by lighting and collecting all of the seven "Super Cellar Door" values. Also, once player has earned five extra balls in a game, each one earned thereafter awards a score bonus.

Game quotes
 "Well, Looky Here!"
 "Danger! Return to your homes... the storm is coming."
 "Uh oh. Looks like rain...!"
 "It's a twister! It's a twister!"
 "The storm is over... all clear"
 "No storm now...go away!"
 "Y'all come back now, ya here?"

Digital versions
Whirlwind is among the six-year collection of licensed Williams table in The Pinball Arcade for several platforms between 2012 and 2018. The table appeared also in Pinball Hall of Fame: The Williams Collection.

References

External links

 Pinball Archive rule sheet
 Internet Pinball Serial Number Database entry

1990 pinball machines
Williams pinball machines